Tex Tilson may refer to:

 Sumner D. Tilson
 Warren E. Tilson